Sargassum horneri is a species of brown macroalgae that is common along the coast of Japan and Korea. It is an annual algae which has a varying fertile season along the coast. Also called "devil weed", this species has invaded the Eastern Pacific, beginning in Baja California and advancing north along the California coastline.

In its natural ecosystem, Sargassum horneri grows attached to a hard substrate and blooms into a kelp forest which encourages and maintains local biodiversity. However, this species of macroalgae is the major component of the northwest Pacific golden tide, a biomass of Sargassum horneri that drifts up the eastern coast of China towards Korea as an invasive species and is detrimental to the coastal ecosystem there.

References

Fucales